Aleksandr Tkachenko (born 14 November 1955) is a Soviet Olympic boxer. He represented his country in the light-flyweight division at the 1976 Summer Olympics. He won his first match against Eleoncio Mercedes. He lost his second match against Payao Poontarat.

References

1955 births
Living people
Ukrainian male boxers
Soviet male boxers
Olympic boxers of the Soviet Union
Boxers at the 1976 Summer Olympics
Sportspeople from Donetsk
Light-flyweight boxers